Tony Moore (born 14 December 1951) is an Olympic long jumper who competed for the Fiji Olympic Team in the 1976 Montreal Olympic Games. In 2009, Moore was inducted into the Fiji Sports Hall of Fame.

Moore is also a poet, with works exhibited by the Art of the Olympians.

References

External links

1951 births
Living people
Fijian male long jumpers
Athletes (track and field) at the 1974 British Commonwealth Games
Commonwealth Games competitors for Fiji
Athletes (track and field) at the 1976 Summer Olympics
Olympic athletes of Fiji
20th-century Fijian people
21st-century Fijian people